Optical Delusion is the tenth studio album by English electronic music duo Orbital, released on 17 February 2023.

Reception

Track listing

Personnel 
 Orbital – producer (1-8, 10)
 Paul Hartnoll – producer (7)
 Andrew Fearn – producer (7)
 Mediæval Bæbes – vocals (1)
 Dina Ipavic – vocals (2)
 Penelope Isles – vocals (3)
 The Little Pest – vocals (4, 9)
 Anna B Savage – vocals (6)
 Coppe – vocals (10)

Charts

References 

2023 albums
Orbital (band) albums